Ambustus is Latin for "burnt", and may refer to:

 Caeso Fabius Ambustus (fl. 404–390), Roman senator
 Gaius Fabius Ambustus (consul) (fl. 358 BC), Roman senator
 Gaius Fabius Ambustus (magister equitum 315 BC), Roman senator
 Marcus Fabius Ambustus (pontifex maximus 390 BC)
 Marcus Fabius Ambustus (consular tribune 381 BC), Roman senator
 Marcus Fabius Ambustus (consul 360 BC), Roman senator
 Marcus Fabius Ambustus (magister equitum 322 BC), Roman senator
 Numerius Fabius Ambustus(fl. 406–390 BC), Roman senator
 Quintus Fabius Ambustus (tribune) (fl. 390 BC)
 Quintus Fabius Ambustus (dictator) (fl. 321 BC), Roman politician